Hoffman Channel is a waterway in Richmond, California connecting San Francisco Bay with Hoffman Marsh and Fluvius Innominatus creek which drain directly into the channel. The channel is part of Point Isabel Regional Shoreline, the largest dog park in the United States and serves a swimming are for these animals. Hoffman Channel is adjacent to Point Isabel promontory and was formerly a sandy beach on its south shore.

Notes

Bodies of water of Richmond, California
San Francisco Bay
Bodies of water of Contra Costa County, California
Bodies of water of California
Channels of the United States